Heartland is the third studio album by English electronic music group Client, released on 21 March 2007. It is Client's only album to feature Emily Mann (known as Client E) as a member of the band. A limited edition of the album was also released in Germany, including a bonus DVD of all the group's music videos released up to that point.

Track listing

The Rotherham Sessions

A collection of early demo versions from Heartland, titled The Rotherham Sessions, was released on 1 February 2006 as a limited edition download and CD through Client's website.

"Monkey on My Back" – 4:36
"Six in the Morning (Dirty Girl)" – 3:26
"Someone to Hurt" – 5:28
"Leave the Man to Me!" – 3:36
"Loosetalking" – 3:03
"Can't Resist You" – 3:33
"D.I.S.C.O." – 4:10
"Heartland" – 5:11

"D.I.S.C.O." appeared under the title "Northern Soul" as a B-side on the "Lights Go Out" single.

Personnel
Credits adapted from Heartland album liner notes.

Client
 Client – production (1, 8, 9, 11, 1); mixing (9)
 Client A – keyboards, programming
 Client B – vocals
 Client E – bass

Additional
 Tim Bran – piano (3, 5, 7, 10); programming (2–5, 7, 10)
 Tim Burgess – vocals (8)
 Clive Goddard – engineering, mixing (2–5, 7, 10)
 Stephen Hague – production, mixing (6)
 Fabrice Lachant – photography
 Nina Lauer – badge logo
 David Nock – drums (2–5, 7, 10)
 Chuck Norman – drums (6)
 Beatrix Ong – shoes
 Corinna Samow – artwork
 Paul A. Taylor – Client logo
 Paul Tipler – mixing (1, 8, 11, 12) 
 Simon Tong – guitar (3, 5, 7, 10)
 Howie Weinberg – mastering
 David Westlake – drums (1, 8, 11, 12)
 Joe Wilson – production (1, 8, 9, 11, 12)
 Youth – production (2–5, 7, 10); guitar (2, 4)

Release history

References

External links
 Heartland at Out of Line Music

2007 albums
Albums produced by Youth (musician)
Albums produced by Stephen Hague
Client (band) albums
Metropolis Records albums